Harrison Township is one of nine townships in Fayette County, Indiana. As of the 2010 census, its population was 6,450 and it contained 3,046 housing units.

History
Harrison Township was organized in 1819.

Geography

Cities and towns
 Connersville (northwest half)

Unincorporated towns
 Harrisburg
 Huber
(This list is based on USGS data and may include former settlements.)

Adjacent townships
 Washington Township, Wayne County (northeast)
 Waterloo Township (east)
 Connersville Township (south)
 Fairview Township (west)
 Posey Township (northwest)

Major highways
 Indiana State Road 1

References
 
 United States Census Bureau cartographic boundary files

External links
 Indiana Township Association
 United Township Association of Indiana

Townships in Fayette County, Indiana
Townships in Indiana